Rdeči Breg is a dispersed settlement in the Pohorje Hills south of the Drava River in the Municipality of Podvelka in Slovenia.

The local church is dedicated to Saint Ignatius of Loyola and is the only church in Slovenia dedicated to this saint. It is a Baroque church built in 1759.

References

External links

Rdeči Breg on Geopedia

Populated places in the Municipality of Podvelka